First Class is a British game show that originally aired as a regional programme for BBC Wales from 3 October to 19 December 1984 with Louise Bachelor as host. It was then networked on BBC1 on Friday evenings from 8 January 1986 to 21 August 1988 with Debbie Greenwood as host.

Format

The show was Two teams of three students (each team representing a particular school) would take part in a multi-format quiz featuring questions on both general knowledge and popular culture, as well as innovative video game rounds. Rounds such as the "Spinning Gold Disc" made use of a simulated computer display similar to other game shows of the same era, such as Blockbusters and Catchphrase. Other rounds such as "Word of Mouth" used a real computer display from a BBC Micro. This computer also provided the on-screen captions and scores and was nicknamed Eugene, after the show's original programmer Eugene Crozier.

The competition was a knockout tournament; the eventual winners of the series would be presented with a computer (usually a BBC Master) for their school. Celebrity episodes of the show were also aired, featuring cast members from Grange Hill and EastEnders.

First Class was notable for its use of video games; such footage (of arcade games in particular) was a rarely seen on UK television at the time and the show aired several years before GamesMaster. The designated contestant from each team would earn points by beating the other player's score; rounds would be either turn-based and head-to-head depending on the game / event. The games were often referred to by their events as opposed to their titles, for example the "spring and vault" round or the "clay pigeon shooting".

The music used for the programme's titles was "Airborn" by Mike Oldfield, from his 1979 album Platinum.

Arcade games featured
Hyper Sports (skeet shooting and vaulting horse events)
Paperboy
720°

Transmissions

Series

Specials

External links

References

1986 British television series debuts
1988 British television series endings
1980s British television series
BBC television game shows
1980s British game shows
English-language television shows
Student quiz television series